Warley Silva dos Santos (born 13 February 1978) is a Brazilian former footballer who last played as a forward for Botafogo-PB. Warley spent most of his career at Campeonato Brasileiro Série A and had an unsuccessful career with Italian club Udinese.

Club career

Beginnings in Brazil
Warley started his career at Brazil, and played for Coritiba, Atlético Paranaense before signed by Italian Serie A side Udinese in January 1999. He was loaned to São Paulo until June 1999.

Udinese acquired half of his registration rights from a Uruguayan club Rentistas for US$9M, which in fact was received by his player agent. He signed a contract until 30 June 2003.

Udinese & passport controversy
He played his first Serie A match on 19 September 1999 as starter, but Udinese lost the match to Juventus 1–4 while Warley went without a goal. He played 15 league matches that season. In September 2000, he followed Udinese traveled to Poland for the UEFA Cup match against Polonia Warsaw. But Polish officials discovered that his Portuguese passport was fake along with team-mate Alberto. Warley was immediately loaned to Grêmio for a year in order to fulfill the non-EU quota. The quota system was abolished in mid of 2000–01 season, but in June 2001, Warley along with 9 others including 3 of his team-mate (Alberto, Jorginho Paulista & Da Silva), countryman Dida were banned for a year, and 3 youths player were banned for 6 months. The ban later reduced, and on 13 January 2002, he played the first league match of the season, along with Sergio Bernardo Almiron replaced Gonzalo Martínez and David Pizarro in the 75th minutes. He played his first start of the season on 3 March that lost 1–2 to Atalanta. As the team had Roberto Sosa, David Di Michele, Vincenzo Iaquinta, Roberto Muzzi and Siyabonga Nomvethe as forward, Warley played 5 more league matches in the 2001–02 season. In 2002–03 season, he played 16 league matches.

Return to Brazil
In mid-2003, Warley returned to São Caetano and played two Campeonato Brasileiro Série A seasons. In 2005, he swapped to Palmeiras. He signed a one-year contract with Série B side Brasiliense in January 2006, and extended for another year on 8 December 2006. In January 2008, he signed a 1-year contract with Náutico but in August left for Brazilian Série B side ABC Futebol Clube. In January 2009, he signed a contract for the whole Campeonato Carioca campaign for Madureira. Warley was released before the start of Brazilian Série D 2009.

In January 2010, he signed a contract with Villa Nova for 2010 Campeonato Mineiro.

International career
Warley played 4 matches for Brazil during the 1999 FIFA Confederations Cup, starting in the group match against New Zealand and also appearing as a substitute during the lost final against Mexico.

Títulos 
 Atlético Paranaense
 Campeonato Paranaensel: 1998
 Grêmio
 Copa do Brasil: 2001
 Campeonato Gaúcho de Futebol: 2001
 São Caetano
 Campeonato Paulista: 2004
 Brasiliense
 Campeonato Brasiliense de Futebol: 2007
 Treze
 Campeonato Paraibano: 2011
 Campinense
 Campeonato Paraibano: 2012
 Botafogo-PB
 Campeonato Paraibano: 2013, 2017
 Campeonato Brasileiro Série D: 2013

References

External links
 
 
 
 CBF Profile 
 futpedia.globo.com 
 

Brazilian footballers
Brazilian expatriate footballers
Brazil international footballers
1999 FIFA Confederations Cup players
Campeonato Brasileiro Série A players
Serie A players
Association football forwards
Expatriate footballers in Italy
1978 births
Living people
Coritiba Foot Ball Club players
Club Athletico Paranaense players
Udinese Calcio players
São Paulo FC players
Grêmio Foot-Ball Porto Alegrense players
Associação Desportiva São Caetano players
Sociedade Esportiva Palmeiras players
Brasiliense Futebol Clube players
Clube Náutico Capibaribe players
ABC Futebol Clube players
Madureira Esporte Clube players
Villa Nova Atlético Clube players
Treze Futebol Clube players
Campinense Clube players
Botafogo Futebol Clube (PB) players
River Atlético Clube players
Sportspeople from Federal District (Brazil)